Terry Butler may refer to:

Terry Butler (born 1967), American death metal guitarist
Terry Butler (rugby league) (1958–2016), English rugby league footballer
Terry Butler (soccer), Australian soccer player
 Terrence "Geezer" Butler (born 1949), British heavy metal bassist for Black Sabbath